Eugene Albert Emery Gilkes (born 1962), is a male former athlete who competed for England.

Athletics career
Gilkes represented England in the decathlon event, at the 1986 Commonwealth Games in Edinburgh, Scotland. Four years later he represented England and won a bronze medal, at the 1990 Commonwealth Games in Auckland, New Zealand.

He became the national champion in 1988 after winning the AAA Championships.

References

1962 births
English male athletes
Commonwealth Games medallists in athletics
Commonwealth Games bronze medallists for England
Athletes (track and field) at the 1986 Commonwealth Games
British decathletes
English decathletes
Living people
Medallists at the 1990 Commonwealth Games